The Mougoulacha were a Native American tribe that lived near Lake Pontchartrain.

Population
In 1699 Iberville said that the Bayagoula and Mougoulacha together had about 180-250 warriors and an estimated 1,250 people.

Language
The Mougoulacha language was closely related to Choctaw and Chickasaw, which are both Muskogean languages.

Early History
In the year 1699 Pierre Le Moyne d'Iberville journeyed to the east of the Mississippi River Delta and encountered the Mougoulacha tribe. d'Iberville was amazed that the Mougoulacha chief was wearing a blue serge coat. The chief said that the coat was given to him many years ago when Henri de Tonti explored the area. The Mougoulacha chief then showed d'Iberville a letter that was written in french. d'Ibberville determined that the letter was left by Tonti with the Quinipissa tribe fourteen years earlier. This led d'Iberville to believe that the Mougoulacha were actually the remaining members of the Quinipissa tribe.

Culture
The name Mougoulacha (Imongolosha) is believed to mean "People from the other side". The tribe maintained perpetual fires burning in two village temples. The temples were the same size as their homes but decorated with animal carvings. The explorer d'Iberville said that he saw many carvings of possums which they called choucouacha in their native language along with offerings of deer, bear, and bison skins inside the temple. A Jesuit priest named Paul du Ru said that the Mougoulacha had two temples in each village located on opposite sides of a large plaza. Some sources indicate that the Mougoulacha may have been the same tribe as the Quinipissa, Acolapissa and the Tangipahoa. According to several sources related to the Houma, many tribes in the area of Lake Pontchartrain were called Mougoulacha.

References 

Native American tribes in Louisiana
Indigenous peoples of the Southeastern Woodlands